The parallel axis theorem, also known as Huygens–Steiner theorem, or just as Steiner's theorem, named after Christiaan Huygens and Jakob Steiner, can be used to determine the moment of inertia or the second moment of area of a rigid body about any axis, given the body's moment of inertia about a parallel axis through the object's center of gravity and the perpendicular distance between the axes.

Mass moment of inertia

Suppose a body of mass  is rotated about an axis  passing through the body's center of mass. The body has a moment of inertia  with respect to this axis. 

The parallel axis theorem can be applied with the stretch rule and perpendicular axis theorem to find moments of inertia for a variety of shapes.

Derivation
We may assume, without loss of generality, that in a Cartesian coordinate system the perpendicular distance between the axes lies along the x-axis and that the center of mass lies at the origin. The moment of inertia relative to the z-axis is then

The moment of inertia relative to the axis , which is at a distance  from the center of mass along the x-axis, is

Expanding the brackets yields

The integral in the final term is a multiple of the x-coordinate of the center of masswhich is zero since the center of mass lies at the origin. So, the equation becomes:

Tensor generalization 

The parallel axis theorem can be generalized to calculations involving the inertia tensor. Let  denote the inertia tensor of a body as calculated at the centre of mass. Then the inertia tensor  as calculated relative to a new point is

For diagonal elements (when ), displacements perpendicular to the axis of rotation results in the above simplified version of the parallel axis theorem.

The generalized version of the parallel axis theorem can be expressed in the form of coordinate-free notation as

Further generalization of the parallel axis theorem gives the inertia tensor about any set of orthogonal axes parallel to the reference set of axes x, y and z, associated with the reference inertia tensor, whether or not they pass through the center of mass.

Second moment of area
The parallel axes rule also applies to the second moment of area (area moment of inertia) for a plane region D:

Polar moment of inertia for planar dynamics

The mass properties of a rigid body that is constrained to move parallel to a plane are defined by its center of mass R = (x, y) in this plane, and its polar moment of inertia IR around an axis through R that is perpendicular to the plane.  The parallel axis theorem provides a convenient relationship between the moment of inertia IS around an arbitrary point S and the moment of inertia  IR about the center of mass R.

Recall that the center of mass R has the property

where r is integrated over the volume V of the body.  The polar moment of inertia of a body undergoing planar movement can be computed relative to any reference point S,

 

where S is constant and r is integrated over the volume V.

In order to obtain the moment of inertia IS in terms of the moment of inertia IR, introduce the vector d from S to the center of mass R,

 

The first term is the moment of inertia IR, the second term is zero by definition of the center of mass, and the last term is the total mass of the body times the square magnitude of the vector d.   Thus,

which is known as the parallel axis theorem.

Moment of inertia matrix
The inertia matrix of a rigid system of particles depends on the choice of the reference point.  There is a useful relationship between the inertia matrix relative to the center of mass R and the inertia matrix relative to another point S.  This relationship is called the parallel axis theorem.

Consider the inertia matrix [IS] obtained for a rigid system of particles measured relative to a reference point S, given by

where ri defines the position of particle Pi, i = 1, ..., n.  Recall that [ri − S] is the skew-symmetric matrix that performs the cross product,

for an arbitrary vector y.

Let R be the center of mass of the rigid system, then

where d is the vector from the reference point S to the center of mass R.  Use this equation to compute the inertia matrix,

Expand this equation to obtain

 

The first term is the inertia matrix [IR] relative to the center of mass.  The second and third terms are zero by definition of the center of mass R,

And the last term is the total mass of the system multiplied by the square of the skew-symmetric matrix [d] constructed from d.

The result is the parallel axis theorem,

where d is the vector from the reference point S to the center of mass R.

Identities for a skew-symmetric matrix
In order to compare formulations of the parallel axis theorem using skew-symmetric matrices and the tensor formulation, the following identities are useful.

Let [R] be the skew symmetric matrix associated with the position vector R = (x, y, z), then the product in the inertia matrix becomes

This product can be computed using the matrix formed by the outer product [R RT] using the identify

where [E3] is the 3 × 3 identity matrix.

Also notice, that

where tr denotes the sum of the diagonal elements of the outer product matrix, known as its trace.

See also
 Christiaan Huygens
 Jakob Steiner
 Moment of inertia
 Perpendicular axis theorem
 Rigid body dynamics
 Stretch rule

References

External links

Parallel axis theorem
Moment of inertia tensor
 Video about the inertia tensor

Mechanics
Physics theorems
Christiaan Huygens
Moment (physics)

fr:Moment d'inertie#Théorème de transport (ou théorème d'Huygens ou théorème de Steiner)